Opigolix (developmental code name ASP-1707) is a small-molecule, non-peptide, orally active gonadotropin-releasing hormone antagonist (GnRH antagonist) which was under development by Astellas Pharma for the treatment of endometriosis and rheumatoid arthritis. It was also under investigation for the treatment of prostate cancer. It reached phase II clinical trials for both endometriosis and rheumatoid arthritis prior to the discontinuation of its development in April 2018.

See also
 Gonadotropin-releasing hormone receptor § Antagonists

References

External links
 Opigolix - AdisInsight

Abandoned drugs
Secondary alcohols
Amidines
Benzimidazoles
Fluoroarenes
GnRH antagonists
Aromatic ketones